An alcarraza is an earthenware container, traditionally made in Spain.  The container is filled with a liquid, then hung in a drafty place in the shade.  The liquid seeps through the earthenware slowly and is evaporated by the action of the draft, lowering the temperature of the container and keeping the rest of the liquid cool.

The source word for this container name – which exists in this form in Spanish, Galician and Portuguese – is the Arabic  al-kurrāz.

See also
Botijo
Double spout and bridge vessel

References

Containers
Crockery
Drinkware
Spanish pottery